The 1969–70 Gonzaga Bulldogs men's basketball team represented Gonzaga University during the 1969–70 NCAA University Division basketball season. Members of the Big Sky Conference, the Bulldogs were led by nineteenth-year head coach Hank Anderson and played their home games on campus at Kennedy Pavilion in Spokane, Washington.

Junior center Bill Quigg was named to the all-conference team.

References

External links
Sports Reference – Gonzaga Bulldogs: 1969–70 basketball season

Gonzaga Bulldogs men's basketball seasons
Gonzaga